William Patterson (June 4, 1789 – August 14, 1838) was an American farmer, manufacturer and politician. He served as a United States representative from the U.S. state of New York.

Early life
Patterson was born in Londonderry, Rockingham County, New Hampshire, the son of Thomas and Elizabeth (Wallace) Patterson. He attended the common schools and moved to Rensselaerville, Albany County, New York in 1815. The following year Patterson moved to Lyons, Wayne County where he engaged in the manufacture and sale of fanning mills. In 1822, he moved to a farm near Warsaw, New York and engaged in agricultural pursuits, and then settled in Warsaw in 1837.

Political career
Patterson held several local offices in Warsaw, and was elected as a Whig candidate to the Twenty-fifth Congress. He served in Congress from March 4, 1837 until his death in Warsaw on August 14, 1838. He is interred in the Warsaw Town Cemetery.

Family life
Patterson's brother, George Washington Patterson, and nephew, Augustus Frank,
 were also members of the U. S. House of Representatives from New York.

See also
List of United States Congress members who died in office (1790–1899)

References

External links

 
	
	

1789 births
1838 deaths
People from Lyons, New York
Whig Party members of the United States House of Representatives from New York (state)
People from Derry, New Hampshire
People from Rensselaerville, New York
People from Warsaw, New York
19th-century American politicians